This is a complete list of South Korean films that received a domestic theatrical release in 2007.

Source for release dates and box-office admission results (except where cited otherwise): Koreanfilm.org.

Box office
The highest-grossing South Korean films released in 2007, by domestic box office gross revenue, are as follows:

Released

Notes and references

See also 
 2007 in South Korea
 2007 in South Korean music
 Box office number-one films of 2007 (South Korea)

External links 

 Theatrical Releases in 2007 at Koreanfilm.org

2007
Box
South Korean